Siveh Dar (also Romanized as Sīveh Dar; also known as Shīveh Darreh and Sīveh Darreh) is a village in Shepiran Rural District, Kuhsar District, Salmas County, West Azerbaijan Province, Iran. At the 2006 census, its population was 343, in 55 families.

References 

Populated places in Salmas County